My Swordhand Is Singing is a novel written by Marcus Sedgwick, set in the early 17th century. It won the 2007 Booktrust Teenage Prize. It was also shortlisted for the CILIP Carnegie Medal in 2007. Inspired by the original vampire folklore of Eastern Europe, the novel follows the story of Peter, the son of drunkard woodcutter Tomas, and his life in the seemingly normal village of Chust. He and his father travel from place to place, living a nomadic life. They have been working in Chust for over a year when things start to happen — things unexplainable, but things Tomas seems to know about.

My Swordhand is Singing is a story of loss and redemption, written in the genre of Gothic fiction. For this story, Sedgwick went to various gloomy locations for the inspiration and research for the book. "My Swordhand Is Singing" was published by Orion Children's Books and is the seventh Sedgewick novel to be published from here.

References

2006 British novels
British fantasy novels
British young adult novels
Orion Books books